The blue weed whiting (Haletta semifasciata) is a species of ray-finned fish, a weed whiting from the family Odacidae, which is endemic to Australia where it is only found along the southern coast. This species inhabits areas with a substrate of sand with beds of seagrass where it feeds on small invertebrates and algae and the seagrasses themselves. This species grows to a length of  SL. It is of minor importance to local commercial fisheries. This species is the only known member of its genus.

References

Odacidae
Taxa named by Achille Valenciennes
Fish described in 1840